Anna Kozhnikova (born 10 July 1987) is a Russian football defender, currently playing for Lokomotiv Moscow in the Russian Championship.

She is a member of the Russian national team.

International goals

Titles
 2005 U-19 European Championship
 3 Russian Leagues (2005, 2006, 2010)
 5 Russian Cups (2005, 2006, 2008, 2009, 2010)

References

1987 births
Living people
Russian women's footballers
Russia women's international footballers
FC Energy Voronezh players
WFC Rossiyanka players
Women's association football defenders
Universiade silver medalists for Russia
Universiade medalists in football
WFC Lokomotiv Moscow players
ZFK CSKA Moscow players
FIFA Century Club
Sportspeople from Rostov Oblast
UEFA Women's Euro 2017 players
21st-century Russian women
Russian Women's Football Championship players